The Hungarian mixed grill or Fatányéros is a traditional Hungarian mixed meat barbecue dish (or pecsenye in Hungarian), originating from Transylvania.

The dish Fatányéros was on the menu since 1900 at the famous restaurant Wampetich (later Gundel) in the City Park (Városliget) in Budapest, as "fatányéros—Hungarian mixed grill on wooden platter". The dish was served on wooden platter, and contained grilled slices of veal, beef, pork cutlets, and a slice of goose liver and a slice of bacon—grilled or roasted on a spit. As a side dish french fries or thick slices of fried potatoes are served, together with fresh mixed green salad, with a big knife with Hungarian motives stuck in the middle of the steak.
 
Steaks called pecsenye are part of the traditional Hungarian cuisine and may refer to any kind of pan fried meat: pork, beef, poultry or game. Other Hungarian pecsenye or steaks are for example Cigánypecsenye (Gypsy roast).

These steaks are often served on a wooden platter, like Bakonyi pecsenye, Tordai pecsenye or Erdélyi fatányéros, arranged in a very decorative way with garnishing, fried vegetables and salad. 

The dish is popular in Sweden as plankstek (lit. "plank-steak"), and was at its height of popularity there in the 1970s. In Sweden, it is commonly served with duchess potatoes, vegetables, and Béarnaise sauce.

The Swedish book Maträtternas historia, rewarded best book in culinary history 2020 of Gourmand Awards, has a different theory of the origin of the Plankstek. In the food culture of Native Americans, they used to cook fish and sometimes meat on a cherrybrick over open fire. The first time the course appears in New York in Charles Ranhofer cookbook The Epicurean from 1893.

See also

References

Hungarian cuisine
Meat dishes
Romani cuisine